The Embassy of Ukraine in Australia is the diplomatic mission of Ukraine in Australia, located in Canberra. The embassy also holds non-resident accreditation for New Zealand.

History 

Ukraine established diplomatic relations with Australia on 10 January 1992.  Diplomatic relations with New Zealand were established on 3 March 1992. From 1993, Ukraine's interests in Australia have been represented by Honorary Consuls of Ukraine in Melbourne (Zina Botte, and later by Valeriy Botte). By 1999, Ukraine was actively lobbying for its Honorary Consulate to be upgraded to an embassy, with diplomat Ihor Lytvyn visiting Canberra in order to meet with Australian politicians about the idea. In May 2000 the Consulate General was established in Canberra. The Embassy in Australia was opened on 14 April 2003.

Ambassadors

References

External links
 Australia - Ministry of Foreign Affairs of Ukraine
 Embassy of Ukraine in Australia

Canberra
Australia–Ukraine relations
Ambassadors of Ukraine to Australia
Ukraine